The 1972 Maharashtra State Assembly election was held in March 1972 for the fourth term of the Maharashtra Vidhan Sabha. A total of 270 seats were contested.

The Indian National Congress won the largest number of seats and a majority. Vasantrao Naik, the incumbent Chief Minister was reelected. S. K. Wankhede became Speaker of the Legislative Assembly and Ramkrishna Vyankatesh Bet became Deputy Speaker. Dinkar Balu Patil became the leader of the opposition.

List of participating political parties

Results

Party results 

!colspan=10|
|- align=center
!style="background-color:#E9E9E9" class="unsortable"|
!style="background-color:#E9E9E9" align=center|Political Party
!style="background-color:#E9E9E9" |No. of candidates
!style="background-color:#E9E9E9" |No. of elected
!style="background-color:#E9E9E9" |Seat change
!style="background-color:#E9E9E9" |Number of Votes
!style="background-color:#E9E9E9" |% of Votes
!style="background-color:#E9E9E9" |Change in vote %
|-
| 
|align="left"|Indian National Congress||271||222|| 19||8,535,832||56.36%|| 9.33%
|-
| 
|align="left"|Peasants and Workers Party of India||58||7|| 12||856,986||5.66%|| 2.14%
|-
| 
|align="left"|Bharatiya Jana Sangh||122||5|| 1||947,266||6.25%|| 1.92%
|-
| 
|align="left"|Samyukta Socialist Party/Socialist Party||52||3|| 1||693,797||4.58%|| 0.03%
|-
| 
|align="left"|Republican Party of India||118||2|| 3||570,533||3.77%|| 2.89%
|-
| 
|align="left"|Communist Party of India||44||2|| 8||412,857||2.73%|| 2.14%
|-
| 
|align="left"|All India Forward Bloc||26||2|| 2||363,547||2.40%|| 2.40% (New Party)
|-
| 
|align="left"|Shiv Sena||26||1|| 1||279,210||1.84%|| 1.84% (New Party)
|-
| 
|align="left"|Communist Party of India (Marxist)||20||1||||117,134||0.77%|| 0.31%
|-
| 
|align="left"|Bharatiya Kranti Dal||2||1|| 1||31,508||0.21%|| 0.21% (New Party)
|-
| 
|align="left"|Indian Union Muslim League||1||1|| 1||27,138||0.18%|| 0.18% (New Party)
|-
| 
| align="left"|Republican Party of India (Khobragade)
| 56
| 0
| (New Party)
| 202,935
| 1.34%
|  1.34% (New Party)
|-
| 
| align="left"|Indian National Congress (Organisation)
| 49
| 0
| (Split in INC)
| 162,433
| 1.07%
| (Split in INC)
|-
| 
| 5
| 0
| 
| 14,269
| 0.09%
|  1.03%
|-
| 
|align="left"|Independents||343||23|| 7||1,920,667||12.68%|| 1.89%
|-style="background-color:#E9E9E9"
|
|align="left"|Total||1196||270||||15,146,171||60.63%|| 4.21%
|-
|}

Winning candidates 
The following is a partial list of winning candidates.

Results by region

References

State Assembly elections in Maharashtra
1970s in Maharashtra
Maharashtra